U-233 may refer to:
, a German Type X submarine used in World War II
 Uranium-233 (U-233 or 233U), an isotope of uranium